Jaíba is a municipality in the north of the Brazilian state of Minas Gerais.   the population was 39,388 in a total area of . It became a municipality in 1993. The postal code (CEP) is 39508-000.

Jaíba is part of the statistical microregion of Janaúba. It is connected by paved MG-401 to the regional center of Janaúba to the south.

With irrigation Jaíba has managed to produce a range of agricultural products. The main economic activities are cattle raising (62,000 head in 2006) and farming with production of bananas, citrus fruits, mangoes, rice, beans, corn, and sorghum. Cropland made up  and natural pasture . There were only 186 tractors.

In the urban area there were two financial institutions . There were 852 automobiles, giving a ratio of about one automobile for every 35 inhabitants. The Gross Domestic Product was R$117,218,000 (2005). Health care was provided by 12 public health clinics and one hospital with 25 beds (2005).

Municipal Human Development Index
MHDI: .657 (2000)
State ranking: 739 out of 853 municipalities 
National ranking: 3,746 out of 5,138 municipalities 
Life expectancy: 65.4
Literacy rate: 73.6
Combined primary, secondary and tertiary gross enrollment ratio: .698
Per capita income (monthly): R$110.73

See also
List of municipalities in Minas Gerais

References

IBGE

Municipalities in Minas Gerais